Lisa Alborghetti (born 19 June 1993) is an Italian footballer who plays as a midfielder and captains Inter Milan. She plays for Italy national team.

Club career
Alborghetti started playing for ACF Brescia at the age of 15, when the team was playing in the second division (Serie B) in 2008. The club reached the Serie A for the first time in the 2009–10 season with Alborghetti scoring the club's first ever goal at the top division. With two Serie A titles, three Italian Women's Cup titles and three Italian Women's Super Cup titles, almost 200 matches played in all competitions in eight years with the club, it was announced on 30 June 2016 that she was joining Apollon Limassol of Cyprus.

In February 2017, She returned to Italy and played for Atalanta Mozzanica. She stayed there for one more season. In 2018–19 she played for newly founded team A.C. Milan Women.

International  career
Alborghetti has represented her country in the under-17 team and under-19 team, where she scored two goals in the 2011 UEFA Women's Under-19 Championship against Russia and Belgium.

She made her debut for the national team on 8 March 2013 against New Zealand.

Honours

Club
ACF Brescia
Serie A: 2014, 2016
Italian Cup: 2012, 2015, 2016
Super Cup: 2014, 2015, 2016

References

1993 births
Living people
Italian women's footballers
Italy women's international footballers
Footballers from Brescia
Women's association football forwards
Serie A (women's football) players
A.C.F. Brescia Calcio Femminile players
Apollon Ladies F.C. players
Expatriate women's footballers in Cyprus
A.C. Milan Women players
Atalanta Mozzanica Calcio Femminile Dilettantistico players
Inter Milan (women) players
21st-century Italian women